Pedra Furada (literally Drilled Stone) is a naturally formed rock arch located in the municipality of Urubici, state of Santa Catarina, Southern Brazil.

It can be spotted from the summit of a mountain named Morro da Igreja.

External links
 Portal Urubici

Rock formations of Brazil

pt:Parque Nacional de São Joaquim#Atrações